The 2022 UAE Super Cup was the 15th professional and 21st overall UAE Super Cup, an annual football match played between the winners of the previous season's League and President's Cup. It will be contested between the league champions Al Ain and president's cup winner Sharjah. Sharjah won their third super cup title after Kodjo Laba's own goal in the 29th minute costed Al Ain the match.

Details

References

External links

UAE Super Cup
Al Ain FC
UAE Super Cup seasons